Pone may refer to:

Food
 Pone (food), a type of baked or fried bread in American cuisine
 Corn pone, a type of cornbread

Other uses
 Pone (honorific), a Lithuanian honorific for men
 Pone (surname), a surname
 Pone Kingpetch (1935-1982), Thai boxer
 Pone (card player), term for non-dealer in certain card games

See also

 Pwn
 P1 (disambiguation), P-one
 Pony (disambiguation)